Amani Manuel Santos Aguinaldo (born April 24, 1995) is a Filipino professional footballer who plays as a center-back for Thai League 1 club Nakhon Ratchasima and the Philippines national team. He previously played for Thai League 1 club Nongbua Pitchaya.

Education
Aguinaldo attended Ateneo de Davao Grade School until grade 6 and transferred to the High School Department Far Eastern University's FERN College in Quezon City where he attended high school.
Aguinaldo is taking Sports Science at the University of the Philippines Diliman. As of December 2014, he is on his second year.

Club career
After Aguinaldo was scouted by Coach Kim Chul-soo and program director Vince Santos both from Far Eastern University, which prompted him to transfer to Far Eastern University – FERN College where he attended high school. He played a year with the Far Eastern University at the college level before moving to the University of the Philippines.

He was later signed with the Loyola Meralco Sparks where he debuted as a substitute player at Loyala's stint at the 2012 Singapore Cup. He later transferred to Global. in 2013. In 2018, he moved to another Filipino club Ceres-Negros. Ceres-Negros placed him on loan to Malaysian club PKNP where he played in the 2019 Malaysia Super League. In January 2020, he was signed for Thai club Trat ahead of the 2020 Thai League 1 season.

International career

Philippines U-22 Olympic
Aguinaldo was part of the Philippines U-22 Olympic squad that competed in the 2019 Southeast Asian Games held in Philippines. He was one of two senior players of the squad along with Stephan Schröck.

Philippines
In August 2013, he was named in the 21-man squad for the international friendly match against Indonesia on August 14, 2013. He earned his first senior international cap on the said match by replacing James Younghusband in 63rd minute.

He made his first appearance for the under-23 national team in the 1–0 friendly match loss against Singapore on June 13, 2013.

Aguinaldo was a member of the Philippines' squad at both the 2014 AFC Challenge Cup and the 2014 AFF Championship, reaching the finals and semi-finals respectively in each competition. During the latter tournament Aguinaldo was involved in a fair bit of controversy in the first leg of the semi-final as Thai striker Adisak Kraisorn was sent off for an off the ball altercation with the Filipino defender. It appeared that Aguinaldo might have provoked the confrontation and afterwards he and other Filipino footballers received threats from Thai fans.

International goals

U23

Personal life
Aguinaldo is an only child of Ariel and Maida Aguinaldo who both had roots to Davao. His name Amani is derived from an African title meaning both "warrior" and "peace". He was born in Las Piñas, but due to his parents' professions his family moved to Cebu and then Davao City where Aguinaldo spent most of his childhood, before moving back to the Manila area where he attended high school. Aguinaldo took up football from his father at the age of five, and nine years later he was called up to the Philippines U-14 by future Loyola coach Kim Chul-soo. At the age of 16 Aguinaldo was selected to play for the u-21 side at the 2012 Hassanal Bolkiah Trophy. During the tournament Aguinaldo was roomed with twins Marwin and Marvin and became good friends with both. His favorite teams are Manchester City, Bayern Munich, A.C. Milan, and Real Madrid, although his favorite footballer is Lionel Messi.

References

1995 births
Living people
Footballers from Metro Manila
Sportspeople from Davao City
Filipino footballers
Global Makati F.C. players
F.C. Meralco Manila players
Philippines international footballers
Association football defenders
University Athletic Association of the Philippines footballers
Far Eastern University alumni
Amani Aguinaldo
Amani Aguinaldo
Filipino expatriate sportspeople in Thailand
Expatriate footballers in Thailand
University of the Philippines Diliman alumni
2019 AFC Asian Cup players
Competitors at the 2019 Southeast Asian Games
Southeast Asian Games competitors for the Philippines